Delma is a private superyacht. It was pronounced the 27th largest private yacht in the year 2008 in Monte Carlo, Monaco. The Dubai-registered Delma measures length: 279 ft 7 • 85.23 m. It is available for charter.

Both the hull and the superstructure are made of steel and aluminum. The propulsion plant consists of two Caterpillar diesel engines, with a total power of 5060 kW (over 5520 bhp), and controllable-pitch propellers producing a speed of over 17 knots. A hydraulically operated system of shell ports, doors, flaps, roofs, bath platforms, gangways and cranes provide the most possible ease of operation and comfort. The anchors, launches, life rafts and navigation lanterns are hidden behind covers and do not disturb the aesthetics of the yacht.

Overview
Name:	Delma
Type:	Motor Yacht
Model:	Custom
Builder:	Neorion Shipyards Syros
Naval Architect:	Alpha Marine
Exterior Designers:	Alpha Marine
Lally Poulias
Interior Designer:	Alpha Marine
Lally Poulias
Year:	2004
Flag:	Malta
MCA: 	Yes
Class:	Lloyd's Register
Hull NB:	1101
Hull Colour:	-    White

Dimensions
Length Overall:	85.30 m (279 ft 10 in)
Length at Waterline:	74.80 m (245 ft 5 in)
Beam:	14.40 m (47 ft 3 in)
Draft (max):	4.20 m (13 ft 9 in)
Tonnage:	2990 tonnes

Accommodations
Guests:	36
Cabins Total:	-
Cabins:	-
Crew:	34

Construction
Hull Configuration:	Displacement
Hull Material:	Steel
Superstructure:	Aluminum
Deck Material:	Teak
Decks NB:	-
Engine(s)
Quantity:	2
Fuel Type:	Diesel
Manufacturer:	Caterpillar
Model:	3606
Power:	2760 hp / 2030 kW
Total Power:	5520 hp / 4060 kW
Propulsion:	Twin Screw

Performance & Capabilities
Max Speed:	17.0 kn
Cruising Speed:	15.0 kn
Range:	7,000 nmi at 15 kn
Fuel Capacity:	234,455  L / 51,572.87 US Gal
Water Capacity:	110,213  L / 24,243.46 US Gal

Equipment
Generator:	
Stabilizers:	-
Shaft line Propulsion:    - Rolls-Royce propeller 60 P1/4
Reduction gear - Rolls-Royce 480 AGHC 
Thrusters:	- Rolls-Royce 1100 CP KI Tunnel Thruster
Steering gear: - Rolls-Royce SR622
Amenities:	Helicopter Landing Pad

References

http://yachts.monacoeye.com/yachtsbysize/pages/delmaw019.html
http://www.powerandmotoryacht.com/megayachts/megayacht-delma-2007/

Motor yachts
2004 ships